Eas a' Chrannaig also known as the Glenashdale Falls is a waterfall on the island of Arran, Scotland. There are a series of falls on the Glenashdale Burn, which flows from moorland near the summit of Tighvein eastwards towards Whiting Bay, from which there is a tourist trail leading some  up Glenashdale.

See also

Waterfalls of Scotland

References

Landforms of the Isle of Arran
Waterfalls of North Ayrshire